Suely Guimarães (born 19 November 1957) is a paralympic athlete from Brazil competing mainly in category F56 throwing events.

Biography
Suely has competed in five Paralympics, winning three medals.  Her first games were in 1992 where she competed in all three throws winning the gold medal in the discus.  In 1996 she went to Atlanta competing in the shot, javelin and defending her discus title but could only manage a bronze in the discus.  Despite competing in all three throws in 2000 it wasn't until 2004 when competing in just the shot and discus that she regained the discus title.  Her fifth games came in Beijing in 2008 where she again competed in the shot and discus, but could not add further to her medal tally.

References

External links
 
 

1957 births
Living people
Paralympic athletes of Brazil
Paralympic gold medalists for Brazil
Paralympic bronze medalists for Brazil
Paralympic medalists in athletics (track and field)
World record holders in Paralympic athletics
Athletes (track and field) at the 1992 Summer Paralympics
Athletes (track and field) at the 1996 Summer Paralympics
Athletes (track and field) at the 2000 Summer Paralympics
Athletes (track and field) at the 2004 Summer Paralympics
Athletes (track and field) at the 2008 Summer Paralympics
Medalists at the 1992 Summer Paralympics
Medalists at the 1996 Summer Paralympics
Medalists at the 2004 Summer Paralympics
Brazilian female discus throwers
Wheelchair discus throwers
Paralympic discus throwers
20th-century Brazilian women
21st-century Brazilian women